Albert Green may refer to:
Albert Green (Australian politician) (1869–1940), Labor MP and Australian Minister for Defence, 1929–1931
Albert Green (British politician) (1874–1941), British Conservative politician, MP for Derby
Albert Green (footballer, born 1892), English footballer
Albert Green (footballer, born 1907) (1907–1977), association football forward of the 1930s for Lincoln City and others
Albert Green (rugby league), rugby league footballer of the 1920s for Wales, and Pontypridd
Albert E. Green (1912–1999), British applied mathematician
Al Green (born 1946), American gospel and soul music singer

See also
 Albert Greene (disambiguation)
 Bert Green (disambiguation)